Yamna Oubouhou (formerly using the married name Belkacem; born 20 February 1974 in Hagou, Morocco) is a long-distance runner competing internationally for France. She first competed in the track events before moving up to the marathon.

Competition record

Personal bests
Outdoor
1500 metres – 4:08.60 (Villeneuve-d'Ascq 1999)
2000 metres – 5:39.44 (Nancy 1999)
3000 metres – 8:38.13 (Oslo 1999)
5000 metres – 14:47.79 (Stockholm 2000)
10,000 metres – 32:05.98 (Villeneuve-d'Ascq 2001)
10 kilometres – 32:00 (La Courneuve 2001) NR
Half marathon – 1:12:07 (Cannes 2008)
Marathon – 2:31:56 (Paris 2008)

Indoor
2000 metres – 5:49.36 (Liévin 2000)
3000 metres – 8:41.63 (Maebashi 1999) NR

References

1974 births
Living people
French female long-distance runners
French female marathon runners
French female middle-distance runners
Moroccan female long-distance runners
Olympic athletes of France
Athletes (track and field) at the 2000 Summer Olympics
World Athletics Championships athletes for France
Moroccan emigrants to France
Moroccan female middle-distance runners
European Cross Country Championships winners